Miss Venezuela 1989 was the 36th Miss Venezuela pageant, was held in Caracas, Venezuela on February 16, 1989, after weeks of events.  The winner of the pageant was Eva Lisa Ljung, Miss Lara.

The pageant was broadcast live on Venevision from the Poliedro de Caracas in Caracas, for the first time since 1975. At the conclusion of the final night of competition, outgoing titleholder Yajaira Vera, crowned Eva Lisa Ljung of Lara as the new Miss Venezuela. It was the first edition to use CGI effects for the opening credit sequence, a trend that was pioneered from the 1985 pageant onward.

The return to the Poliedro was marked with one of the biggest opening numbers yet in pageant history - a Broadway-themed opening with past pageant alumni (Elluz Peraza, Raquel Lares, Viviana Gibelli, 1986 runner-up Maite Delgado, 1988 winner Yajaira Vera and 1988 runner-up Emma Rabbe) and those who took part in every pageant of the 80s joining the 28 entrants.

Results
Miss Venezuela 1989 - Eva Lisa Ljung (Miss Lara)
Miss World Venezuela 1989 - Fabiola Candosin (Miss Distrito Federal) 
Miss Venezuela International 1989 - Carolina Omaña (Miss Nueva Esparta) 
Miss Wonderland Venezuela 1989 - Luicira Marcano (Miss Táchira)
Miss Venezuela Latina 1989 - Heidi Gorrín (Miss Aragua)

The runners-up were:
1st runner-up - Michelle Chilberry (Miss Zulia)
2nd runner-up - Patricia Velásquez (Miss Península Goajira)
3rd runner-up - Ericka Correia (Miss Mérida)
4th runner-up - Meribel Suárez (Miss Yaracuy)
5th runner-up - Gladys Cordozo (Miss Anzoátegui)

Special awards
 Miss Photogenic (voted by press reporters) - Daniela Sucre (Miss Sucre)
 Miss Congeniality - Yulis Díaz (Miss Monagas)
 Miss Elegance - Luicira Marcano (Miss Táchira)

Delegates
The Miss Venezuela 1989 delegates are:

 Miss Amazonas - Susana Blanca Baserva Matheus
 Miss Anzoátegui - Gladys Beatriz Cardozo Rondón
 Miss Apure - Marcela Walerstein Martin
 Miss Aragua - Heidi Loren Gorrín González
 Miss Barinas - Judsan Del Carmen (Timty) Dahl Daal
 Miss Bolívar - Carmen Tibisay Cañas Marín
 Miss Carabobo - Judith Manzanilla Wehlering
 Miss Cojedes - Rosmarth Wendy Freytes Belisario
 Miss Costa Oriental - Ninoska Ríos Tomassini
 Miss Delta Amacuro - Fabiola Oleydi Inciarte Pozo
 Miss Dependencias Federales - Claudia Pittia Torres
 Miss Distrito Federal - Fabiola Candosín Marchetti
  Miss Falcón - Amanda Valeria Marinelli Stevens
 Miss Guárico - Yoletty Beatriz Cabrera Armas
 Miss Lara - Eva Lisa Ljung Larsdotter
 Miss Mérida - Ericka Helena Correia Rodríguez
 Miss Miranda  - Rosmary Rosario Socorro Díaz
 Miss Monagas - Yulis Paulette Díaz Pereira
 Miss Municipio Libertador - Adelheid Salswach Fasanaro
 Miss Municipio Vargas - Claudia Kateryna Rojas Yovalenko 
 Miss Nueva Esparta - Beatriz Carolina Omaña Trujillo
 Miss Península Goajira - Patricia Carola Velásquez Semprún
 Miss Portuguesa - Mary Graciela Mosquera Villegas
 Miss Sucre - María Daniela Sucre Marotta
 Miss Táchira - Luicira Zaly Marcano Reyes
 Miss Trujillo - Alejandra Montilla
 Miss Yaracuy - Meribel Suárez Benítez
 Miss Zulia - Michelle de Lourdes Chilberry Palanqué

External links
Miss Venezuela official website

1989 beauty pageants
1989 in Venezuela